Fictor Gideon Roring (born 18 December 1972) is an Indonesian basketball coach and former player. The fourth child of five siblings, he graduated from Negeri 03 Jakarta of High School and became a professional basketball player, playing for league clubs Pelita Jaya, Aspac and Satria Muda BritAma as well as the Indonesian national side. When he retired from playing in 2001, he was appointed coach of Perbana and then Satria Muda before coaching the Indonesia national basketball team in the 2007 SEA Games in Thailand. Following this, he established a basketball academy. In 2015, he returned as coach of the Indonesia national team, taking home silver from the 2015 SEA Games in Singapore. Later in 2015, he signed to be head coach of Garuda Bandung in the IBL league. He is the father of two children.

Career Head Coach 
After retiring as a basketball player in 2001, he decided to become a coach.

Satria Muda BritAma 
Satria Muda is the first team he trained and under his leadership they won the IBL league title in 2004, 2005, and 2007.

Garuda Bandung 
After training the Indonesian national team, he signed a contract in 2015 to coach Garuda Bandung.

Statistic

Indonesia Men's Basketball Team 
In 2007, he first coached the Indonesia national basketball team in the Indonesia SEA Games. He was appointed national team coach for the Indonesia SEA Games in 2015. He also coached in the arena SEABA Championship in Singapore.

References

1972 births
Living people
Indonesian basketball coaches
Indonesian men's basketball players
People from Manado
Sportspeople from North Sulawesi